McGillis is a surname. Notable people with the surname include:

Angus McGillis (1874–1944), Canadian farmer and politician
Dan McGillis (born 1972), Canadian ice hockey player
Kelly McGillis (born 1957), American actress
Tom McGillis, Canadian writer and producer

See also
McGinnis